Zhang Jue (died October 184) was a Chinese military general and rebel. He was the leader of the Yellow Turban Rebellion during the late Eastern Han dynasty of China. He was said to be a follower of Taoism and a sorcerer. His name is sometimes read as Zhang Jiao, since the Chinese character of Zhang's given name can be read as either "Jiao" or "Jue". "Jue" is the traditional or literary reading, while "Jiao" is the modern or colloquial one.

Yellow Turban Rebellion
Before the outbreak of the rebellion, Zhang Jue had spent more than a decade preparing for it. He was able to cure patients who sought his help by giving them water blessed by his rituals; those who recovered then believed in him and his teachings, and his fame spread by word of mouth. Professor Rafe de Crespigny noted that disease outbreaks were reported in Han-dynasty China in 171, 173, 179, 182, and 185 CE, with the potential cause theorized as the Antonine Plague of 165 to 180CE of smallpox or measles spreading along the Silk Road.

Giving himself the title of "Great Teacher", Zhang Jue led the Yellow Turban Rebellion with his younger brothers Zhang Bao and Zhang Liang in a campaign called the "Way of Heaven" or "Way of Peace". He and his brothers gave themselves titles: Zhang Bao was the "General of Earth", Zhang Liang was the "General of the People"; and Zhang Jue was the "General of Heaven". The Yellow Turbans claimed to be Taoists, and rebelled against the Han dynasty in response to burdensome taxes, rampant corruption, and famine and flooding, which were seen as indications that the Han emperor had lost the mandate of heaven.

The rebellion began in March 184. The Yellow Turbans conquered much in the early years of the rebellion, but later could not hold out against Han imperial forces led by He Jin, Lu Zhi, Dong Zhuo, Huangfu Song, Zhu Jun and others. Although the Yellow Turbans still remained capable even in face of their more powerful foe, they were nonetheless torn apart upon the death of their leader, Zhang Jue, and were eventually defeated and dispersed. Zhang Bao was defeated and killed by imperial forces led by Huangfu Song and Guo Dian in December 184 or January 185 at Xiaquyang County (west of present-day Jinzhou, Hebei), while Zhang Liang also met his end in November or December 184 at the hands of imperial forces led by Huangfu Song at Guangzong County (southeast of present-day Guangzong County, Hebei).

Large groups of Yellow Turbans roamed through China for years after the rebellion's defeat, most of them eventually joining the army of the warlord Cao Cao, whose agrarian reform policies closely matched Zhang Jue's own programme.

In Romance of the Three Kingdoms
Zhang Jue is also featured in the 14th-century historical novel Romance of the Three Kingdoms. He is introduced in Chapter 1 as follows:

Zhang Jue then goes on to start the Yellow Turban Rebellion with his brothers. Little time is devoted to Zhang Jue in the book, and his death is given a line in the second chapter: "Zhang Jue had died before his (Huangfu Song's) arrival." After his death, his body was beheaded and his head sent to the capital Luoyang. In the novel, his brother Zhang Bao does not die in battle against imperial forces, but meets his end at the hands of a subordinate, Yan Zheng, who cuts off his head and surrenders to imperial forces.

In popular culture

Zhang Jue appears as a playable character in Koei's Dynasty Warriors and Warriors Orochi video games series, as well as serving as an antagonist in Capcom's Destiny of an Emperor for the Nintendo Entertainment System. He is referred to as "Zhang Jiao" in these games. He is also seen as one of the antagonists of the light gun shooting game SEGA Golden Gun.

In Total War: Three Kingdoms fourth DLC installment, Mandate of Heaven, Zhang Jue and his brothers lead the playable Yellow Turban factions who seek to overthrow the failing Han dynasty and establish a new order in China.

In the upcoming action role-playing game  Wolong: Fallen Dynasty, Zhang Jue appears as a boss fight.

See also
 Lists of people of the Three Kingdoms

References

Chen, Shou (3rd century). Records of the Three Kingdoms (Sanguozhi).

Fan, Ye (5th century). Book of the Later Han (Houhanshu).
Luo, Guanzhong (14th century). Romance of the Three Kingdoms (Sanguo Yanyi).
Pei, Songzhi (5th century). Annotations to Records of the Three Kingdoms (Sanguozhi zhu).

Year of birth unknown
2nd-century births
184 deaths
Generals from Hebei
Han dynasty generals from Hebei
Han dynasty rebels
Yellow Turban Rebellion
Posthumous executions